Dylan Felipe Borrero Caicedo (born 5 January 2002) is a Colombian footballer who plays as a winger for MLS club New England Revolution.

Club career

New England Revolution

The New England Revolution announced April 22, 2022, that they had signed Borrero to a three-year deal (with a one year club option) as part of MLS' U22 initiative for a reported fee of $4.5 million. Atlético Mineiro would retain a 20% sell-on fee as part of the move.

Head coach Bruce Arena complimented Borrero's pace and technical play and noted the club had been monitoring Borrero for a year prior to the signing. Jonathan Sigal, writing in MLSoccer.com, stated that Borrero's arrival should help New England counterbalance the loss of Canadian winger Tajon Buchanan in the winter transfer window to Club Brugge.

On June 12, 2022, Borrero made his first start with his new club and subsequently recorded his first assist; a lobbed-pass to Gustavo Bou to put his team up 1-0 over Sporting Kansas City. The Revolution would go on to win the match 2-1.

Borrero would score his first goal for the Revolution the following week against Minnesota United FC, on a shot deflected off of a Minnesota defender past keeper Dayne St. Clair.

Career statistics

Club

Notes

Honours
Atlético Mineiro
Campeonato Brasileiro Série A: 2021
Copa do Brasil: 2021
Campeonato Mineiro: 2020, 2021, 2022
Supercopa do Brasil: 2022

References

2002 births
Living people
People from Palmira, Valle del Cauca
Colombian footballers
Association football midfielders
Colombia youth international footballers
Categoría Primera A players
Campeonato Brasileiro Série A players
Independiente Santa Fe footballers
Clube Atlético Mineiro players
New England Revolution players
New England Revolution II players
Colombian expatriate footballers
Colombian expatriate sportspeople in Brazil
Colombian expatriate sportspeople in the United States
Expatriate footballers in Brazil
Expatriate soccer players in the United States
Sportspeople from Valle del Cauca Department
Major League Soccer players
MLS Next Pro players
Colombia international footballers